Los Gatos (Spanish for "The Cats")  were an Argentine rock group of the late 1960s, founded in the wake of an earlier group, Los Gatos Salvajes, who shared two of the same members. They are considered part of the founding trinity of Spanish-language rock in Argentina, along with Almendra and Manal. The unexpected success of their 1967 debut single "La balsa" was the kickstarter of Argentine rock, and pioneered Spanish-language rock.

History

The group was started in the wake of an earlier band Los Gatos Salvajes, who had shared two the same members, in 1967. They recorded their first two singles "Ayer Nomás" and A-side "La Balsa", which turned into an unpredicted large scale hit in the Argentine winter of 67, selling over 200,000 copies, leading to their full-length debut later that year. The following year they went on tour around the Southern Cone, and then released their 3rd album Seremos Amigos, permeating psychedelic rock during the height of that subgenre of rock.

The band's next effort after a short break-up, 1969's Beat N°1, featured the addition to the group of Pappo. His rocking blues style with Litto Nebbia's more classical melodic approach at times made the album uneven, but also created quite dazzling passages of music that can be considered one of the earliest recordings of progressive rock anywhere in the world, previewing the rise of the genre around the world in the 1970s.

In 1970, Los Gatos released their final major album. Originally called Rock de la mujer podrida (literally "Rotten woman's rock"), the band was forced to change the name of the release by government censorship to Rock de la mujer perdida ("Lost woman's rock").  A harder rocking album with Pappo's fingerprints all over, it would be Los Gatos's last. Later that year Pappo left the band to form his own heavy blues-rock group Pappo's Blues. Los Gatos disbanded after a last batch of concerts, with Litto Nebbia kicking off his solo career.

Discography

Studio albums
 Los Gatos (1967)
 Los Gatos (1968)
 Seremos amigos (1968)
 Beat N° 1 (1969)
 Rock de la mujer perdida (1970)

Live albums
 Inédito: ¡En vivo!  (1987)
 Reunión 2007 en vivo (2007)

Singles
 "La balsa" / "Ayer nomás" (1967)
 "Ya no quiero soñar" / "El rey lloró" (1967)
 "El vagabundo" / "Ayer nomás" (1968)
 "La mujer sin nombre" / "Las vacaciones" (1968)
 "No hay tiempo que perder" / "Un día de fiesta" (1968)
 "Seremos amigos" / "La chica del paraguas" (1968)
 "Viento, dile a la lluvia" / "Déjame buscar felicidad" (1968)
 "Sueña y corre" / "Soy de cualquier lugar" (1969)
 "Rock de la mujer perdida" / "Escapando de mí" (1970)
 "Mamá rock" / "Campo para tres" (1971)

See also

Origins of Argentine Rock

References 

Argentine pop music groups
Argentine rock music groups